Charles L. "Pie" Dufour (1903–1996) was an American newspaper journalist, historian, humorist, and book author from New Orleans, Louisiana who served as a columnist for the New Orleans States-Item newspaper.  He wrote approximately 9700 installments of his column "Pie Dufour's A La Mode" for the States-Item and for the Sunday edition of the New Orleans Times-Picayune during his newspaper tenure, from 1949 until his retirement in 1978.  He authored 20 books and approximately 50 articles for scholarly literature.  Dufour's column covered diverse topics including Louisiana history, New Orleans Mardi Gras, law, local sports, classical music, New Orleans cuisine, and European travel.

Dufour lived his entire life in New Orleans, except to serve in the US Army in World War II in a non-journalistic role.  He enrolled at Tulane University for college in 1921, although he commenced his career with newspapers before completing his degree.  He ultimately completed his college degree in 1953.  Dufour was awarded an honorary doctorate of humane letters by Tulane University in 1978, after retiring as a newspaper columnist.

Together with fellow local historian John Churchill Chase, he taught a course on New Orleans history at Tulane University for 25 years.  Dufour referred to this course as "New Orleans on the Half Shell" as an acknowledgement of its emphasis on food and culture.  Dufour was a member of the gourmet group in New Orleans called "La Societe des Escargots Orleanais".

A 1967 article in The New York Times characterized Dufour as a columnist and historian "who has devoted most of his professional life to the idea that history is news".

Selected works 
Charles L. Dufour, John Chase, Walter G. Cowan, Osborne K. Leblanc, John Wilds. New Orleans, Yesterday and Today:  A Guide to the City 
Charles L. Dufour, The Night the War was Lost, University of Nebraska Press, 1994, .
Charles L. Dufour, The Mexican War: A Compact History 1846 – 1848, Hawthorne Publishers, 1968.
Charles L. Dufour, Gentle Tiger:  The Gallant Life of Roberdeau Wheat, Louisiana State University Press, 1999, .
Charles L. Dufour, Ten Flags in the Wind: The Story of Louisiana. Harper & Row Publishers, 1967.

 References 

External links
Copies of Pie Dufour's A La Mode'' column are available through the historical archives maintained by the New Orleans Times-Picayune newspaper.
An extensive collection of research papers, notes, and publications by Charles L. Dufour is maintained by the Louisiana Research Collection of the Howard-Tilton Memorial Library of Tulane University.
A photograph of Charles "Pie" Dufour is available on-line courtesy of the Louisiana Digital Library of the University of Louisiana Lafayette.

Historians of the United States
1903 births
1996 deaths
Tulane University alumni
20th-century American historians
American male non-fiction writers
Culture of New Orleans
American male journalists
20th-century American journalists
United States Army personnel of World War II
Tulane University faculty
Writers from New Orleans
United States Army soldiers
20th-century American male writers
Historians from Louisiana